Veliki Kabao, also known as Zubački Kabao, or simply Mount Orjen, is a mountain peak on the border of Bosnia and Herzegovina and Montenegro. At 1,894 m, it is the highest summit of the Orjen Range in the Dinaric Alps. It is also the highest peak of the eastern Adriatic.

Marked trail to Zubački Kabao from the Orjen Saddle is the oldest mountaineering trail in Montenegro. It was constructed during the 1880s by the Austro-Hungarian Army led by general Varešanin, in preparation for the visit of Prince Rudolf who made the ascent to the peak in 1886.

From Veliki Kabao views spread across the surrounding Dinaric range, as far as Trebinje and Popovo field, the Bay of Kotor and the Adriatic coast, and inland as far as Durmitor, while to the south-east lies the Skadar Lake and the mountains of Albania.

Gallery

References

Mountains of Montenegro
Orjen
Herceg Novi Municipality
Trebinje
V